Angus McDonald (December 30, 1769 – October 14, 1814) was an American military officer, landowner, and planter in the U.S. state of Virginia. McDonald served as a military officer during the War of 1812 following his appointment by United States President James Madison. McDonald was the son of Virginia military officer and frontiersman Colonel Angus McDonald and the father of Colonel Angus William McDonald, a commander in the Confederate States Army during the American Civil War.

Early life
Angus McDonald was born on December 30, 1769, at "Glengarry" near Winchester, Frederick County in the Colony of Virginia. He was the third child and second-eldest son of prominent Virginia militiaman, frontiersman, and landowner Angus McDonald and his wife, Anna Thompson McDonald. McDonald was of Scottish descent through his father, and of English and Dutch descent through his mother. McDonald was raised on his father's plantation, "Glengarry," and upon reaching adulthood, he resided on his own farm which was in close proximity to "Glengarry." Even though McDonald was primarily a farmer, he engaged in a number of other business and leisure pursuits. McDonald and his brother John also received  in Kentucky to be divided between them.

Marriage and children
McDonald married Mary McGuire (died 1809), daughter of Edward McGuire and his wife Millicent D'Obee, on January 11, 1798. Mary McGuire's maternal grandfather was French architect Samuel D'Obee, charged by Thomas Jefferson with supervising the construction of the Virginia State Capitol in Richmond. McDonald and his wife had three children, two sons and one daughter:

Angus William McDonald (February 14, 1799, Winchester, Virginia – December 1, 1864, Richmond, Virginia), married first to Leacy Anne Naylor on January 11, 1827, second to Cornelia Peake on May 27, 1847
Millicent McDonald, married first to William Sherrard, second to Richard Holliday
Edward Charles McDonald (July 26, 1803 – 1862), married first to Frances Elizabeth Singleton in 1833, second to Susan Peake in 1842

McDonald named his eldest son, Angus William, in honor of his father Angus McDonald and his brother-in-law William McGuire. His daughter Millicent was named for McDonald's mother-in-law Millicent D'Obee McGuire, and his youngest son Edward Charles was named for Charles Edward Stuart, leader of the Jacobite rising of 1745 in which McDonald's father had served under Stuart's command. In March 1809, McDonald's wife Mary died and she was interred beside her father, Edward McGuire, in the Old Catholic Churchyard in Winchester. Following her death, McDonald's children were sent to "Glengarry" to be raised by his mother, Anna Thompson McDonald.

Military career
During the onset of the War of 1812, McDonald was commissioned as a first lieutenant on March 12, 1812, in the 12th Infantry Regiment of the Regular Army. On June 24, 1814, McDonald received a commission to the rank of captain in the 12th Infantry Regiment following a nomination and appointment by United States President James Madison on February 1 of that year. McDonald was subsequently promoted to the rank of major in 1814.

On October 14, 1814, McDonald died in a military hospital in Batavia, New York from health complications caused by a "very long and trying" forced march. McDonald's final messages along with his belongings, which included his sword and sash, were delivered to his mother and children at "Glengarry" by his colleague and friend, Colonel John Strother, who had been present at McDonald's death. The McDonald family was very grateful to Strother for his actions and the two families remained close. Fifty years later, during the American Civil War, McDonald's son Colonel Angus William McDonald interceded on Strother's behalf when he was arrested by McDonald's Confederate squad for treason in August 1861. McDonald said of Strother, "he had been kind to my father, was his fellow soldier, tended him on his death-bed and was kind to me as his son. I never forgot it and I was never ungrateful."

McDonald's mother continued to raise McDonald's three children at "Glengarry" following his death.

References

Bibliography

 

1769 births
1814 deaths
18th-century American Episcopalians
19th-century American Episcopalians
American military personnel killed in the War of 1812
American people of Dutch descent
American people of Scottish descent
American planters
Angus McDonald family of Virginia and West Virginia
British North American Anglicans
People from Virginia in the War of 1812
People from Winchester, Virginia
United States Army officers
Virginia colonial people
American people of English descent